Sidi Safi is a municipality in north-western Algeria.

It includes the ruins of the Punic and Roman settlement Camarata.

References 

Communes of Aïn Témouchent Province
Cities in Algeria
Algeria